Stage Coach Inn, also known as Royal Johnson House, is a historic inn located at Lapeer in Cortland County, New York.  It was built about 1830 and is a two-story, rectangular five bay center entrance frame building.  It features a full Greek Revival style entrance with pilasters, a full entablature, and two-paneled door with sidelights.  It served as a home, hostelry for stage coach travelers, a post office, as well as a dance hall.  The second floor dance hall remains intact.  It remained in the Johnson family from the time of its construction to the early 21st century.

It was listed on the National Register of Historic Places in 2009.

References

Houses on the National Register of Historic Places in New York (state)
Houses completed in 1830
Greek Revival architecture in New York (state)
Houses in Cortland County, New York
1830 establishments in New York (state)
National Register of Historic Places in Cortland County, New York